Megan Martha White (born December 10, 1974) is an American former musician and singer, best known as the drummer of the duo The White Stripes. She is credited as one of the key artists in the garage rock revival of the 2000s, and has been nominated for various awards as a part of the White Stripes, including winning four Grammy Awards.

White's music career began when, on a whim, she played on her future White Stripes bandmate Jack White's drums in 1997. They decided to form The White Stripes together, and began performing two months later. The band quickly became a Detroit underground favorite before achieving international fame with their 2001 breakthrough album White Blood Cells. While on tour in support of the White Stripes' 2007 album Icky Thump, she suffered a bout of acute anxiety and the remaining dates of the tour were canceled. After a few public appearances and a hiatus from recording, the band announced in February 2011 that they would be disbanding. White has not been active in the music industry since.

White calls herself "very shy" and keeps a low public profile. She and Jack publicly portrayed themselves as siblings, but public records revealed that they had married in 1996 and divorced in 2000, before the White Stripes became popular. In 2009, she married guitarist Jackson Smith, the son of musicians Patti Smith and Fred "Sonic" Smith, and they divorced in 2013.

Early life 
Megan Martha White was born in the affluent Detroit suburb of Grosse Pointe Farms, Michigan, on December 10, 1974, the daughter of Catherine and Walter Hackett White Jr. She has an older sister, Heather. She attended Grosse Pointe North High School and, according to one classmate, was "always the quiet, obviously artistic type, and she just kept very much to herself". While still in high school, she decided not to go to college and instead pursue a career as a chef. She began to work at Memphis Smoke, a restaurant in downtown Royal Oak, where she first met budding musician Jack Gillis, a fellow high school senior from a Detroit neighborhood known as Mexicantown, and they frequented the coffee shops, local music venues, and record stores of the area.

Career 
According to the band, on Bastille Day (July 14) of 1997, Meg tried playing Jack's drumkit on a whim. In Jack's words, "When she started to play drums with me, just on a lark, it felt liberating and refreshing. There was something in it that opened me up." The two then began calling themselves The White Stripes (because Meg favored peppermint candies) and soon played their first gig at the Gold Dollar in Detroit. Their live performances were made of three basic elements, Jack did the guitar and vocal work while she played drums.

Jack and Meg presented themselves as siblings to an unknowing public, and kept to a chromatic theme, dressed only in red, white, and black. They began their career as part of Michigan's underground, garage rock music scene. They played along with and opened for more established local bands such as Bantam Rooster, the Dirtbombs, Two Star Tabernacle, Rocket 455, and the Hentchmen, among others. In 1998, the band signed with Italy Records, a small and independent Detroit-based garage punk label of Dave Buick. The band released its self-titled debut album in 1999, and a year later the album was followed up by the cult classic, De Stijl. The album eventually peaked at number 38 in Billboard's Independent Albums chart. Although they were divorced in 2000, White insisted that they keep the band going.

The White Stripes rose to widespread recognition in 2001 with the release of their album White Blood Cells, which brought them to the forefront of the garage rock revival and made them one of the most acclaimed bands the following year. This success was propelled with the release of their 2003 album Elephant, which similarly earned acclaim and its first single, "Seven Nation Army", became the band's signature song and a sports anthem. Several writers for AllMusic called Meg's drumming "hypnotic" and "explosively minimal", and Bram Teltelman of Billboard described it as "simple but effective". Elephant won a Grammy Award for Best Alternative Music Album and "Seven Nation Army" won the Grammy Award for Best Rock Song. Their later albums, 2005's Get Behind Me Satan and 2007's Icky Thump, each won acclaim and Grammy Awards for Best Alternative Music Album; the latter's title track also won the Grammy Award for Best Rock Song, totaling four Grammy Awards won out of eight nominations received throughout her career, among other accolades.

Though Jack usually sang lead vocals, Meg occasionally sang as well, the first time being backup on the record "Your Southern Can is Mine" from De Stijl. She sang lead on four Stripes' songs: "In the Cold, Cold Night", from the album Elephant, "Passive Manipulation" from Get Behind Me Satan, "Who's a Big Baby", the B-side to "Blue Orchid," and "St. Andrew (This Battle Is in the Air)" from Icky Thump. She also sang the Christmas song "Silent Night" on the single Candy Cane Children. Both Meg and Jack share vocal duties on the tracks "Hotel Yorba" and "This Protector" from White Blood Cells, "Rated X" from the "Hotel Yorba" single, "Well It's True That We Love One Another" on Elephant, and "Rag and Bone" from Icky Thump. Andrew Katchen with Billboard magazine called her vocals "delicate and sweet".

White has appeared on the cover of Whirlwind Heat's single "Pink", in a Detroit Cobras music video "Cha Cha Twist" as Little Red Riding Hood, and appeared with Jack White in a segment of Jim Jarmusch's 2003 film Coffee and Cigarettes. She has done some modeling for Marc Jacobs' 2006 Spring line. Two of her pictures appeared in the March 2006 issue of ELLE. She was chosen by Bob Odenkirk to compose a drum theme for Dax Shepard's character in the 2006 film Let's Go to Prison; against Odenkirk's wishes however, the studio removed it from the film. The White Stripes guest starred on The Simpsons in an episode titled "Jazzy and the Pussycats", which first aired on September 17, 2006.

In the summer of 2007, before a show in Southaven, Mississippi, Ben Blackwell (Jack's nephew and the group's archivist) says that Meg approached him and said, "This is the last White Stripes show". He asked if she meant of the tour, but she responded, "No. I think this is the last show, period." On September 11, 2007, the White Stripes announced via their website that they were canceling 18 tour dates due to Meg's acute anxiety. The following day, the duo canceled the remainder of their 2007 UK tour dates as well. Jack worked with other artists in the meantime, but Meg remained largely out of the public eye, though in June 2008, she appeared briefly onstage during an encore set of a Detroit show with one of Jack's bands, the Raconteurs. In an interview with Music Radar, Jack explained that Meg's acute anxiety had been a combination of a very short pre-tour rehearsal time—that was further reduced by the birth of his son—and a hectic, multi-continental touring schedule. He said, "I just came from a Raconteurs tour and went right into that, so I was already full-speed. Meg had come from a dead-halt for a year and went right back into that madness."

Jack revealed the band's plan to release a seventh album by the summer of 2009. On February 20, 2009—and on the final episode of Late Night with Conan O'Brien—the band made their first, and what would be their last, live appearance after the cancellation of their tours, performing the song "We're Going to Be Friends". A documentary about their Canadian tour—titled The White Stripes: Under Great White Northern Lights—premiered at the Toronto International Film Festival on September 18, 2009. Directed by Emmett Malloy, the film documents the band's summer 2007 tour across Canada and contains live concert and off-stage footage. The duo appeared at the film's premiere and, before the movie started, they made a short speech about their love of Canada and why they chose to debut their movie in Toronto. A second feature titled Under Nova Scotian Lights was prepared for the DVD release, however almost two years passed with no new releases.

On February 2, 2011, the band reported on their official website that they were disbanding. The statement emphasized that it was not due to health issues or artistic differences, but "mostly to preserve what is beautiful and special about the band". White has not been active in the industry since.

Personal life
White and Jack White dated in the mid 1990s, and were married on September 21, 1996, with Jack taking her last name, and divorced on March 24, 2000. From May 2009 to July 2013, she was married to guitarist Jackson Smith, the son of musicians Patti Smith and Fred "Sonic" Smith; their wedding took place in a small ceremony in Jack White's backyard in Nashville, Tennessee.

White suffers from acute anxiety, and she has described herself as "very shy". She told Rolling Stone in 2005 that "the more you talk, the less people listen". Following the cancellation of several 2008 tour dates for The White Stripes, Jack stated that "Meg is a very shy girl, a very quiet and shy person. To go full-speed from a dead-halt is overwhelming, and we had to take a break." As of 2014, White resided in Detroit.

Artistry

White's musical influences are wide and varied, with Bob Dylan being her favorite artist. In reference to her "primal" approach to drumming, she remarked, "That is my strength. A lot of drummers would feel weird about being that simplistic." She expanded by saying that "I appreciate other kinds of drummers who play differently, but it's not my style or what works for this band. I get [criticism] sometimes, and I go through periods where it really bothers me. But then I think about it, and I realize that this is what is really needed for this band. And I just try to have as much fun with it as possible." Her pre-show warm up included "whiskey and Red Bull."

White began with a red Ludwig Classic Maple kit that had a red and white peppermint swirl on the resonant heads of the toms and bass drum.  Her Pearl Export bass drum—complete with original peppermint-painted bass drum that she used with the band's first show—and the Pearly Queen outfit she wore in the photos for the Icky Thump album, were featured in the Rock and Roll Hall of Fame "Women Who Rock" exhibition. On the Icky Thump tour, the bass drum head design was switched to a button inspired by the Pearlies clothing Jack and Meg wore for the album cover. While recording From the Basement: The White Stripes, the design was switched to an image of White's hand holding the apple from the Get Behind Me Satan cover. 

Beginning in 2006, White used a pair of Paiste 14" Signature Medium Hi-Hats, a 19" Signature Power Crash, and a 22" 2002 Ride. She also used Remo and Ludwig drumheads, various percussion instruments and Vater drumsticks. She later donated her Ludwig kit to the 2009 Jim Shaw Rock 'N' Roll Benefit, an auction to raise money for the Detroit musician who was suffering from cancer.

Reception 
White is considered a key figure in the garage rock revival of the 2000s, and she has earned several positive reviews from critics and fans for her simplistic and "primal" drumming style. Her strict maintenance of her privacy and giving few interviews has also been the subject of significant commentary. NPR dubbed her the "21st Century's Loudest Introvert".

Of a 2002 concert in Cleveland, Ohio, Chuck Klosterman said, "[Meg] never grimaced and didn't appear to sweat; yet somehow her drums sounded like a herd of Clydesdales falling out of the sky, one after another. Clearly this is a band at the apex of its power". UK newspaper The Times said that she "reduced the art of drumming to its primary components, bashing the snare and cymbal together on alternating beats with the bass drum in a way that recalled Moe Tucker of the Velvet Underground." An NPR article gave high praise, saying "On the drums, Meg White smashed out carnal, visceral, raw, sometimes funny and always urgent stories that told of the human experience." Dave Grohl of Foo Fighters and previously Nirvana praised White's drumming, stating in an interview that she was "one of my favorite fucking drummers of all time. Like, nobody fucking plays the drums like that." Tom Morello of Rage Against the Machine wrote in an Instagram post that White "has style and swag and personality and oomph and taste and awesomeness that's off the charts and a vibe that's untouchable". In contrast, Associated Press called her playing "maddeningly rudimentary", and the satirical news site The Onion once featured the headline "Meg White Drum Solo Maintains Steady Beat For 23 Minutes". In response to negative consensus, Jack White stated Meg's drumming to be the "best part of this band", and called her a "strong female presence in rock and roll". He called her detractors "sexist".  

After writer Lachlan Markay called White's drumming a "tragedy" and "terrible" in response to a National Review article written about the 20 year anniversary of "Seven Nation Army" on Twitter, several musicians and critics came to her defense, and White trended as a result. Hip-hop musician Questlove called the comments "out of line af. [...] what is wrong w music is people choking the life out of music like an Instagram filter—-trying to reach a high of music perfection that doesn’t even serve the song (or music)". Singer Karen Elson, who was married to Jack White from 2005 to 2013, wrote that "Not only is Meg White a fantastic drummer, Jack also said the White Stripes would be nothing without her. To the journalist who dissed her, keep my ex husband’s ex wife name out of your f*cking mouth." Journalist Annie Zaleski wrote, "Onstage with the White Stripes, Meg White looked terminally nonchalant and chill while maintaining a steady backbeat and ensuring that the band’s songs never got off track. Calling what she did simple undermines the whole approach of her technique and execution." Jack White responded to the comments with a poem. Markay later apologized and deleted his comments.

Rolling Stone included White on their 2016 list of the "100 Greatest Drummers of All Time" and wrote that her "idiosyncratic, primal take on drumming was fundamental to the appeal of the White Stripes, who rode their candy-colored outfits and stripped-down blues to rock stardom in the early Aughts." They also wrote that her "art and sheer talent defined one of the most important bands of the 21st century". NME included her on their 2018 list of "32 of the best drummers to grace rock 'n' roll." She appeared on the Universal Music Group's 2022 list of "100 Best Drummers" and was deemed "rock music’s most compelling stickswoman." Clash titled her "One of Rock's Greatest Drummers" in 2023.

Filmography

Discography

With the White Stripes 

 The White Stripes (1999)
 De Stijl (2000)
 White Blood Cells (2001)
 Elephant (2003)
 Get Behind Me Satan (2005)
 Icky Thump (2007)

Awards and nominations
White has received several accolades with the White Stripes, which includes one Brit Award from six nominations, four Grammy Awards from seven nominations, and a nomination for an American Music Award.

Major associations

Notes

References

Works cited

Further reading
Sullivan, Denise (2004). The White Stripes: Sweethearts of the Blues. Backbeat Books.  Google Print (accessed June 1, 2006)

External links

 Official site of the White Stripes
 
 

1974 births
Living people
20th-century American drummers
20th-century American women musicians
21st-century American drummers
21st-century American women musicians
American contraltos
American photographers
American rock drummers
American women drummers
Grammy Award winners
Musicians from Detroit
People from Grosse Pointe Farms, Michigan
The White Stripes members